Mountain willow is a common name for several plants and may refer to:

Salix arbuscula, native to Europe
Salix eastwoodiae, native to western North America